Alan John Dixon (July 7, 1927 – July 6, 2014) was an American politician and member of the Democratic Party who served in the Illinois General Assembly from 1951 to 1971, as the Illinois Treasurer from 1971 to 1977, as the Illinois Secretary of State from 1977 to 1981 and as a U.S. Senator from 1981 until 1993.

Early life
Born in Belleville, Illinois on July 7, 1927, Dixon attended Illinois public schools and later earned his bachelor's degree from the University of Illinois at Urbana-Champaign and his J.D. from Washington University in St. Louis. While attending the University of Illinois, he joined the Delta Upsilon fraternity. During World War II, Dixon served in the United States Navy.

State political career

General Assembly
Dixon served as a member of the Illinois House of Representatives from 1951 to 1963 and as a member of the Illinois State Senate from 1963 to 1971, serving as Minority Whip for part of that time.

Karl Rove and the Dixon campaign incident
In the fall of 1970, Karl Rove, a future White House Deputy Chief of Staff in the George W. Bush Administration, used a false identity to enter the office of Dixon's campaign for Illinois Treasurer and stole 1000 sheets of paper with campaign letterhead. Rove then printed fake campaign rally fliers promising "free beer, free food, girls and a good time for nothing", and distributed them at rock concerts and homeless shelters, with the effect of disrupting Dixon's rally. Dixon eventually won the election. Rove's role would not become publicly known until August 1973. Rove told the Dallas Morning News in 1999, "It was a youthful prank at the age of 19 and I regret it."

1976 elections
In 1976, Dixon was elected Illinois Secretary of State. The 1976 Illinois State election was turbulent for the Democratic Party. Outgoing Governor Dan Walker had lost the support of the Party and was defeated in the primary election. Dixon's election as Secretary of State left two years on his term as State Treasurer. To prevent Walker from appointing himself or anyone else to the position, Dixon proposed to incoming Republican Governor James R. Thompson that he would resign after Thompson was inaugurated if Thompson agreed to Dixon's choice for State Treasurer. Dixon's choice was Donald R. Smith, a Republican who was the ranking Civil Service employee in the State Treasurer's office and who had agreed not to run for re-election.

Dixon served as Secretary of State until 1981, when he took office as a United States senator from Illinois.

United States Senate
Dixon was generally considered a moderate and was less visible nationally than either of his Illinois colleagues, Charles Percy and Paul Simon, both of whom sought the presidency. In 1992, Dixon lost in the Democratic primary for U.S. Senate to Carol Moseley Braun. This defeat shocked observers; at the time no Senator had been defeated in a primary in over a decade and Dixon had a long record of electoral success. His vote to confirm Clarence Thomas to the Supreme Court contributed to his defeat. Dixon was sharply criticized during the campaign by Braun for supporting Clarence Thomas' nomination despite allegations of Thomas sexually harassing Anita Hill.

Braun, a black woman, had the complete support of black voters, and as a known reformist liberal got a large share of liberal voters, and also attracted many women voters in what was termed "The Year of the Woman".

Another factor was the third candidate in the race, multi-millionaire attorney Al Hofeld. Hofeld drew away some of the moderate and conservative Democrats who normally supported Dixon. He also spent a large amount of money running advertisements attacking Dixon, weakening his support.

The Chicago Tribune ran a piece in which Eric Zorn claimed that Dixon's voting to confirm Clarence Thomas in 1991 set off a chain of events that led to Barack Obama's election as president in 2008.

Later life and death
Dixon chaired the Defense Base Realignment and Closure Commission in 1994 and 1995.

After his term in the Senate, Dixon resumed practicing law with the Bryan Cave law firm in St. Louis and lived in Fairview Heights, Illinois, where he died on July 6, 2014, from natural causes just 1 day shy of his 87th birthday.

His autobiography, The Gentleman from Illinois: Stories from Forty Years of Elective Public Service, was published in 2013 by Southern Illinois University Press.

Awards
Alan J. Dixon was inducted as a Laureate of The Lincoln Academy of Illinois and awarded the Order of Lincoln (the State's highest honor) by the Governor of Illinois in 1994 in the area of Government.

Electoral history
 1980 General Election - U.S. Senate
 Alan J. Dixon (D), 56.0%
 Dave O'Neal (R), 42.5%
 1986 General Election - U.S. Senate
 Alan J. Dixon (D) (inc.), 65.4%
 Judy Koehler (R), 34.1%
 1992 Democratic Primary - U.S. Senate
 Carol Moseley Braun (D), 38.30%
 Alan J. Dixon (D) (inc.), 34.61%
 Albert Hofeld (D), 27.09%

References

External links
 Chicago Tribune obituary
 
 

|-

|-

|-

1927 births
2014 deaths
United States Navy personnel of World War II
Democratic Party United States senators from Illinois
Illinois lawyers
Democratic Party Illinois state senators
Democratic Party members of the Illinois House of Representatives
People from Belleville, Illinois
Secretaries of State of Illinois
State treasurers of Illinois
United States Navy sailors
University of Illinois Urbana-Champaign alumni
Washington University School of Law alumni
Writers from Illinois